Sweet Taste of Liberty: A True Story of Slavery and Restitution in America is a book by W. Caleb McDaniel. It  won the 2020 Pulitzer Prize for History.

References 

Pulitzer Prize for History-winning works